Paul Hatfield is the name of:

 Paul Hatfield (Canadian politician) (1873–1935), Canadian politician, member of both Parliament and Senate
 Paul G. Hatfield (1928–2000), American judge and Montana senator